Nicolas Monckeberg Díaz (born 31 July 1973) is a Chilean politician. He was born in a family of German descent. He completed his secondary education in the Tabancura College in Santiago. He joined the Faculty of Law of the Catholic University of Chile caling of lawyer. He completed a Master of Liberal Arts major at Harvard Extension School.

He was the President of the Chamber of Deputies of Chile between 2012 and 2013.

References

1973 births
Living people
Politicians from Santiago
Presidents of the Chamber of Deputies of Chile
Members of the Chamber of Deputies of Chile
Chilean Roman Catholics
Chilean people of German descent
Government ministers of Chile
Harvard Extension School alumni
Labor ministers
Pontifical Catholic University of Chile alumni
National Renewal (Chile) politicians